WVNY (channel 22) is a television station licensed to Burlington, Vermont, United States, serving the Burlington, Vermont–Plattsburgh, New York market as an affiliate of ABC. It is owned by Mission Broadcasting, which maintains a shared services agreement (SSA) with Nexstar Media Group, owner of Fox affiliate WFFF-TV (channel 44, also licensed to Burlington), for the provision of certain services. Both stations share studios on Mountain View Drive in Colchester, Vermont, while WVNY's transmitter is located on Vermont's highest peak, Mount Mansfield.

Like other network stations serving Burlington and Plattsburgh, WVNY has a large audience in southern Quebec, Canada. This includes Montreal, a city that is 10 times more populous than the station's entire U.S. viewing area, as well as the Montérégie region. Most Vidéotron systems in southern Quebec carry WVNY as their ABC affiliate.

History

Early years
WVNY-TV signed on the air on August 19, 1968, and aired an analog signal on UHF channel 22. It was the first station in the area to air live broadcasts in color. The station initially operated from studios located on Hegeman Avenue in Colchester. In 1974, it changed its call letters to WEZF-TV to match its sister FM radio station, WEZF. WEZF-TV was the host station for the 1980 Winter Olympics and the famous "Miracle on Ice" hockey game between the United States and Soviet Union.

Citadel/Smith Media era
International TV Corporation sold WEZF-TV to Citadel Communications in 1982. As the station was no longer co-owned with WEZF radio, on November 4, 1982, the call letters were switched back to WVNY so as to comply with a since-repealed FCC regulation prohibiting TV and radio stations in the same market, but with different ownership from sharing the same call sign. WVNY later moved its operations to a new facility on Market Square, off Shelburne Road/US 7 in South Burlington.

From its inception until the late 1990s, channel 22 competed against fellow ABC affiliate WMTW-TV in Portland, Maine; WMTW's analog transmitter on Mount Washington covered most of Vermont. WMTW had been the ABC affiliate of record for the market until WVNY-TV signed on, and continued to be offered on many of the area's cable systems well into the 1980s. From the 1980s until 1995, WVNY dropped ABC's General Hospital in favor of cartoons; the soap opera could still be seen in the area via CFCF-TV in Montreal, which has long been carried on Champlain Valley cable systems. WVNY also preempted some of ABC's Saturday morning offerings for syndicated ones. It also aired Boston Red Sox baseball games on Friday nights. In March 1977, the station began airing The Edge of Night in its recommended 4 p.m. time slot and later moved it to 10:30 a.m. In April 1983, amid declining ratings against Sale of the Century on WPTZ, the soap opera was dropped by WVNY. The station also dropped I Married Dora in favor of the 1987 Sea Hunt syndicated program on Friday nights. From 1987 to 1990, the station aired Canadian Football League games as part of the league's broadcast syndication service, the Canadian Football Network (CFN); the CFN was backed by the Global Television Network, then a loose-knit television system, which lacked an affiliate in Montreal at the time (it would eventually gain a Quebec station in 1997).

Citadel sold WVNY, along with WMGC-TV (now WIVT) in Binghamton, New York, to the U.S. Broadcast Group in 1995, who in turn sold it to Straightline Communications in 1998. Unlike the other two stations owned at the time by Straightline Communications (WTVX in Fort Pierce, Florida, and WLWC in New Bedford, Massachusetts, which were operated through LMAs by Viacom's Paramount Stations Group as sister properties to Viacom-owned stations in the adjacent Miami–Fort Lauderdale and Boston markets, respectively), Straightline operated WVNY outright. Straightline sold WTVX and WLWC to Viacom outright in November 2001 but retained WVNY.

During the 1990s, WVNY frequently dropped network programming in favor of infomercials. As a result, several ABC shows were never seen in Montreal except on satellite. However, in the late 1990s, WVNY began airing the entire ABC schedule, which continues to this day. The only exceptions were from 2003–2005, as it would preempt Jimmy Kimmel Live! for the same purpose (at first only the last half-hour of the show but later the whole hour) and the Sunday edition of Good Morning America from 2004 to 2005, as well as its first incarnation of the program from 1993 to 1999.

In 2005, WVNY became a sister station to WFFF-TV after Lambert Broadcasting acquired this station and entered into a local marketing agreement with Smith Media (owner of WFFF-TV). The company then moved WVNY into that station's Colchester facilities. This arrangement placed WVNY in the unusual position of being the junior partner as an ABC-affiliated station in a virtual duopoly with a Fox affiliate (most virtual or legal duopolies involving a Fox affiliate and a Big Three-affiliated station result in the Fox affiliate serving as the junior partner).

A retransmission dispute forced Time Warner Cable systems to replace WVNY with future sister station WUTR from Utica, New York, on December 16, 2010. At the same time, WFFF-TV was replaced by WNYF-CD from Watertown. Both stations returned to the lineup on January 8, 2011.

Mission/Nexstar era
Lambert Broadcasting agreed to sell WVNY to Mission Broadcasting on November 5, 2012. Concurrently, Smith Media sold WFFF-TV to Nexstar Broadcasting Group, which operates all of Mission's stations through shared services agreements. On January 14, 2013, the FCC approved the sale of WVNY. The transaction was completed on March 1. At the sale's closure, Utica NBC affiliate WKTV was left as Smith Media's only remaining television station property until its sale to Heartland Media was consummated in 2014.

On January 27, 2016, it was announced that Nexstar would buy Media General for $4.6 billion. WVNY and WFFF became part of "Nexstar Media Group", joining a cluster of television stations Nexstar owns in New England, including fellow ABC affiliate WTNH in New Haven, Connecticut, CBS affiliate WPRI-TV in Providence, Rhode Island, and NBC affiliate WWLP in Springfield, Massachusetts. In addition, WVNY and WFFF also became sisters with fellow ABC and Fox affiliates WTEN and WXXA-TV, respectively, in Albany, New York. These stations also serve Bennington County, Vermont, making Nexstar responsible for ABC and Fox programming in 13 of the 14 counties in Vermont. The lone exception, Windham County, is served by Boston's WCVB-TV and WFXT, respectively (ABC programming in Windham County is also available through Manchester, New Hampshire's WMUR-TV).

On June 15, 2016, Nexstar announced that it has entered into an affiliation agreement with Katz Broadcasting for the Escape, Laff, Grit, and Bounce TV networks (the last one of which is owned by Bounce Media LLC, whose COO Jonathan Katz is president/CEO of Katz Broadcasting), bringing one or more of the four networks to 81 stations owned and/or operated by Nexstar, including WVNY and WFFF-TV.

News operation

Since the 1980s, WVNY has made attempts at operating a local news department and airing newscasts but none of them ever made any headway in Nielsen ratings against WCAX-TV and NBC affiliate WPTZ; both were respectively among the strongest affiliates of both CBS and NBC, even if their strength was shown more in Montreal than in Vermont. In contrast, WVNY has perennially been one of ABC's weakest affiliates. Besides the difficulties of being the youngest network affiliate in the market, it was a UHF station in an area that is very mountainous. UHF stations usually do not get good reception in rugged terrain.

WVNY's last and most successful attempt at a separate news department was begun on August 9, 1999 with nightly newscasts at 6 and 11 branded as ABC 22 News.  There were also weekday morning local news and weather cut-ins at :25 and :55 past the hour during World News This Morning (now America This Morning from 6 until 7, and Good Morning America from 7 until 9. However, due to financial troubles, production was shut down on September 12, 2003. This resulted in the termination of 25 news-related personnel.

After WVNY moved into WFFF-TV's studios in 2005, Smith Media made an announcement that the company was planning to establish a joint news department for the two stations. On March 3, 2008, WFFF added a weeknight and Saturday broadcast at 7 on WVNY known as Fox 44 Local News on ABC. As a result, this station became first in the area to offer local news in the time slot. The move to launch the show was due in part to tough competition of newscasts at 6 seen on WCAX-TV and WPTZ. As is the case on WFFF-TV, the WVNY broadcasts are produced in high definition. The Saturday edition eventually moved to 6:30 which has been the case on Sundays from the start in order to accommodate ABC programming.

On August 18, 2008, WFFF-TV began airing a two-hour weekday morning show called Fox 44 Local News This Morning. Included in the launch were local news and weather cut-ins on WVNY during its airing of Good Morning America. This occurs at :25 and :55 past the hour from 7 until 9, in which at those times the two stations simulcast each other. Eventually, an additional hour of the broadcast starting at 6 was added to WVNY and is known as ABC 22 This Morning. This station has since expanded the show to a traditional two hour morning newscast starting at 5. At some point in time, WVNY added nightly broadcasts at 6 and 11. Its news schedule now resembles that of other big three affiliates offering local news, even though they are produced by senior partner WFFF-TV. All newscasts seen on this station were formerly known as ABC 22 News, but are now known as Local 22 News, as has been the theme on many Nexstar stations as of late. Currently, the station offers 19½ hours of news a week (with 3½ hours each weekday and one hour on weekends), which is the lowest news output in the Burlington–Plattsburgh market.

Due to the relatively new status of the news department, there is a Vermont focus in coverage. During weather forecast segments, WFFF-TV uses live NOAA National Weather Service radar data from three regional sites. It is presented on-screen in a system known as "Sky Tracker HD Triple Doppler". Weather forecasts from WFFF-TV can be heard on WSNO (AM 1450), WMOO (FM 92.1)/W257AU (FM 99.3), WDOT (FM 95.7), WWFY (FM 100.9), WCPV (FM 101.3), WEXP (FM 101.5)/WTHK (FM 100.7)/W264AB (FM 104.7), and WRFK (FM 107.1).

Notable former on-air staff
 Andrew Catalon (now at CBS Sports)
 Tabitha Soren (later at MTV)

Technical information

Subchannels
The station's digital signal is multiplexed:

Analog-to-digital conversion
WVNY on digital channel 13 became the first VHF high definition station in the market when it signed on in 2006. The station shut down its analog signal, over UHF channel 22, on February 17, 2009, the original target date in which full-power television stations in the United States were to transition from analog to digital broadcasts under federal mandate (which was later pushed back to June 12, 2009). The station's digital signal remained on its pre-transition VHF channel 13. Through the use of PSIP, digital television receivers display the station's virtual channel as its former UHF analog channel 22. It has had difficulty achieving equivalent coverage with its digital signal compared to analog channel 22 raising concerns some parts of Vermont would be left without a full-power ABC affiliate. This turned out to be the case for Enosburg, Vermont in Franklin County. The channel 22 position was given to CBS affiliate WCAX-TV for its digital operation.

As a part of the repacking process following the 2016-2017 FCC incentive auction, WVNY relocated to VHF channel 7 on July 3, 2020, using PSIP to display its virtual channel number as 22.

Former translator
WVNY was formerly seen on analog repeater W09BB (channel 9) in Schroon Lake, New York. The translator had a transmitter southeast of the town's Severance section and did not have an application to air a digital signal; its license has since been canceled.

During the analog era and for a time after the digital transition, WVNY operated five additional repeater signals. Originally, WIXT-TV in Syracuse, New York served Massena and Malone. On September 23, 1987, this was replaced by new sign-on WFYF in Watertown. However, both stations were available in Massena and Malone for a short time. Eventually, WVNY added repeater station W60AF on channel 60 in Malone.

References

External links

Television channels and stations established in 1968
1968 establishments in Vermont
VNY
ABC network affiliates
Laff (TV network) affiliates
Grit (TV network) affiliates
Quest (American TV network) affiliates
Nexstar Media Group
1980 Winter Olympics